NGC 5533 is an unbarred spiral galaxy in the constellation Boötes. It was discovered by the astronomer William Herschel on May 1, 1785. It has a regular structure, with one tightly wound spiral; its disk is inclined about 53 degrees towards the line of sight.

It is a member of the NGC 5557 Group, along with several other galaxies.

Gallery

References

External links 
 

Boötes
5533
Unbarred spiral galaxies